Year 1106 (MCVI) was a common year starting on Monday (link will display the full calendar) of the Julian calendar.

Events 
 By place 

 Europe 
 Spring – Bohemond I, prince of Antioch, marries Constance of France (daughter of King Philip I) in the cathedral of Chartres. Philip agrees to marry his second daughter, the 9-year-old Cecile of France, to Tancred (nephew of Bohemond). Meanwhile, Bohemond mobilises an expeditionary force (some 30,000 men) to begin a campaign against Emperor Alexios I (Komnenos).
 August 7 – Emperor Henry IV escapes his captors at Ingelheim. He enters into negotiations at Cologne with English, French and Danish noblemen, and begins to collect an army to oppose his son Henry V but dies at Liège after a 49-year reign. Henry leads a successful expedition against Count Robert II of Flanders and is forced to swear his allegiance to him.
 September 28 – Battle of Tinchebray: King Henry I defeats and imprisons his older brother Robert II (Curthose), duke of Normandy, in Devizes Castle. Edgar Atheling (uncle of Henry's wife) and the 3-year-old William Clito, son of Robert, are also taken prisoner. Henry places his nephew William in the custody of Helias of Saint-Saens, count of Arques.
 Autumn – Bohemond I returns to Apulia (Southern Italy) with an expeditionary force to prepare an offensive against the Byzantines. He is accompanied by his newlywed wife Constance (who is pregnant by him) and followers. 
 Sultan Yusuf ibn Tashfin dies after a 45-year reign. He is succeeded by his 22-year-old son Ali ibn Yusuf as ruler of the Almoravid Empire. Ali appoints his brother Tamin ibn Yusuf as governor of Al-Andalus (modern Spain).
 Bolesław III (Wrymouth), duke of Poland, begins a civil war against his half-brother Zbigniew, for control over Lesser Poland and Silesia.
 The city of Balaguer (located in Catalonia) is conquered from the Moors by Ermengol VI, count of Urgell.

 England 
 Roger le Poer, bishop of Salisbury, is granted land in south Wales by Henry I. He starts the construction of Kidwelly Castle on the banks of the river Gwendraeth.
 Magnus Erlendsson becomes Earl of Orkney (until 1115).

 By topic 

 Astronomy 
 February 2 – A comet (the Great Comet of 1106) is seen and reported by several civilisations around the world. Lasting for 40 days, the comet grows steadily in brightness until finally fading away.

Births 
 Alexios Komnenos, Byzantine co-emperor (d. 1142)
 Celestine III, pope of the Catholic Church (d. 1198)
 David FitzGerald, bishop of St. Davids (d. 1176)
 Fujiwara no Michinori, Japanese nobleman (d. 1160)
 Hugh II (du Puiset), French nobleman (d. 1134)
 Hugh de Beaumont, 1st Earl of Bedford (d. 1141)
 Ibn Asakir, Syrian scholar and historian (d. 1175)
 Jeong Jung-bu, Korean military leader (d. 1179)
 Magnus I (Nilsson), king of Sweden (d. 1134)
 Matilda of Anjou, duchess of Normandy (d. 1154)
 Minamoto no Yorimasa, Japanese military leader (d. 1180)
 Xing (or Xing Shi), Chinese empress (d. 1139)

Deaths 
 February 3 – Khalaf ibn Mula'ib, Uqaylid emir
 April 16 – Arnold I, Lotharingian nobleman
 May 1 – Conon (or Cuno), Lotharingian nobleman
 May 19 – Geoffrey IV (Martel), French nobleman
 June 16 – Benno, bishop of Meissen (b. 1010)
 June 24 – Yan Vyshatich, Kievan nobleman 
 August 7 – Henry IV, Holy Roman Emperor (b. 1050)
 August 23 – Magnus, German nobleman (b. 1045)
 September 13 – Peter (Pierre), French nobleman
 September 17 – Manasses II, archbishop of Reims
 October 7 – Hugh of Die, French bishop (b. 1040)
 Ali ibn Tahir al-Sulami, Syrian jurist and philologist
 Domnall Ua Conchobair, king of Connacht
 Gonzalo Núñez de Lara, Castilian nobleman
 Hugh of Fauquembergues, prince of Galilee (or 1105)
 Jikirmish (or Jekermish), Seljuk ruler (atabeg)
 John of Lodi, Italian hermit and bishop (b. 1025)
 Li Gonglin, Chinese painter and antiquarian (b. 1049)
 Lothair Udo III, margrave of the Nordmark (b. 1070)
 Máel Muire mac Céilechair, Irish cleric and writer
 Minamoto no Yoshiie, Japanese samurai (b. 1039)
 Nathan ben Jehiel, Italian Jewish lexicographer 
 Richard II (the Bald), prince of Capua (or 1105)
 Yusuf ibn Tashfin, sultan of Morocco (b. 1009)

References